Lara Michel was the defending champion, but chose not to participate.

Tara Moore won the title defeating Myrtille Georges in the final 7–6(7–5), 5–7, 6–4.

Seeds

Draw

Finals

Top half

Bottom half

References
 Main Draw
 Qualifying Draw

Aegon Pro-Series Loughborough - Singles
2011 Women's Singles